Cryptanthus colnagoi is a plant species in the genus Cryptanthus. This species is native to Brazil.

Cultivars
 Cryptanthus 'Fred Ross'
 Cryptanthus 'Pixie'
 Cryptanthus 'Tabasco'
 Cryptanthus 'Thelma O'Reilly'

References

BSI Cultivar Registry Retrieved 11 October 2009

colnagoi
Flora of Brazil